2013 in Bellator MMA was the eighth installment of the Bellator MMA, which began on January 17, 2013 and ended on April 4, 2013.

Mixed martial arts tournaments were held in five weight classes and all of the champions, except the heavyweight champion, placed their titles on the line during this season.

This season marked the beginning of Bellator MMA (formerly Bellator Fighting Championships) airing on Spike TV.

Bellator 85

Bellator 85 took place on January 17, 2013 at the Bren Events Center in Irvine, California. The event was distributed live in prime time by Spike TV.  It marked the season debut of season eight.

Background

Bellator 85 was to open with a fight chosen exclusively by fans in the "Bellator: Vote For The Fight" contest.  Fans could log onto Spike.com to select the two fighters they want to see square off in the first ever Bellator bout on Spike TV.  The eligible fighters were all welterweights and included Paul Daley, Douglas Lima, Ben Saunders and War Machine. Initially a bout between Daley and War Machine was announced by Bellator, but it was subsequently cancelled when War Machine tore his ACL and broke his fibula.

Results

Bellator 86

Bellator 86 took place on January 24, 2013 at WinStar World Casino in Thackerville, Oklahoma. The event was distributed live in prime time by Spike TV.

Background

Bellator 86 featured the opening round of the Season Eight Welterweight Tournament.

The card also featured the Bellator debut of Muhammed Lawal, against veteran Polish fighter Przemyslaw "Misiek" Mysiala.

Results

Bellator 87

Bellator 87 took place on January 31, 2013 at Soaring Eagle Casino in Mount Pleasant, Michigan. The event was distributed live in prime time by Spike TV.

Background

Bellator 87 featured fights the quarterfinals of the Season Eight Lightweight Tournament.

Patricky Freire was originally supposed to face Guillaume DeLorenzi in the main event.  However, on the day of the weigh ins Freire was pulled from the card due to an "undisclosed injury" and replaced by Saad Awad.

Results

Bellator 88

Bellator 88 took place on February 7, 2013 at The Arena at Gwinnett Center in Duluth, Georgia.  The event was distributed live in prime time by Spike TV.

Background

Bellator 88 featured the opening round of the Season Eight Featherweight Tournament as well as a title fight for the vacant Middleweight title.

A middleweight bout between Kelvin Tiller and Dave Vitkay was originally announced for this card, but failed to materialize.

Results

Bellator 89

Bellator 89 took place on February 14, 2013 at The Bojangles' Coliseum, in Charlotte, North Carolina. The event was distributed live in prime time by Spike TV.

Background

Bellator 89 featured the opening round of the Middleweight tournament.

The event also featured the first defense for Eduardo Dantas of the Bantamweight Title since he won it from Zach Makovsky in May 2012.  It marked the first time two training partners and friends have fought for a title in the Bellator promotion.

Results

Bellator 90

Bellator XC took place on February 21, 2013 at the Maverik Center in West Valley City, Utah.  The event was distributed live in prime time by Spike TV.

Background

Bellator 90 featured the finals of the Bellator Season 7 Featherweight Tournament.

The card also featured the Light Heavyweight and Welterweight tournament semifinals.

Results

Bellator 91

Bellator 91 took place on February 28, 2013 at the Santa Ana Star Center in Rio Rancho, New Mexico. The event was distributed live in prime time by Spike TV.

Background

Bellator 91 featured the first title defense by Light Heavyweight champion Christian M'Pumbu, despite having won the belt in May 2011.

Alexander Sarnavskiy was originally scheduled to face David Rickels in the semifinals.  However, Sarnavskiy fractured his hand during his first fight and had to withdraw from the tournament.  He was replaced with Jason Fischer.

Results

Bellator 92

Bellator 92 took place on March 7, 2013 at the Pechanga Resort and Casino in Temecula, California. The event was distributed live in prime time by Spike TV.

Background

The card was originally scheduled to have the season 7 Lightweight tournament final between Dave Jansen and Marcin Held.  However, Held was injured and the fight was delayed two weeks to Bellator 93.

Results

Bellator 93

Bellator 93 took place on March 21, 2013 at the Androscoggin Bank Colisée in Lewiston, Maine. The event was distributed live in prime time by Spike TV and featured the Season Seven Lightweight Tournament Final.

Background

Ben Saunders and Douglas Lima were scheduled to have a rematch on this card to decide the winner of the Bellator Season 8 Welterweight Tournament Final.  However, Lima broke his hand and the match was delayed until later in the year.

Heavyweights Brett Rogers and Eric Prindle were scheduled to face each other on this card.  However, the week leading up to the show it was announced that Prindle had pulled out of the bout due to an injury.

Jon Lemke defeated Jesse Erickson to kick off the event for the night and marked Bellator's 800th Fight in the history of the company.

Results

Bellator 94

Bellator 94 took place on March 28, 2013 at the USF Sun Dome in Tampa, Florida. The event was distributed live in prime time by Spike TV and featured the Light Heavyweight and Lightweight Tournament Finals.

Background

Tony Fryklund made his return to mixed martial arts on this card after a 6-year absence. His last fight was a losing effort against Cung Le at a Strikeforce event in June 2007.

A bout between middleweights Ivan Devalle and Rory Shallcross was originally announced for this card, but failed to materialize.

Results

Bellator 95

Bellator 95 took place on April 4, 2013 at the Revel Casino in Atlantic City, New Jersey. The event was distributed live in prime time by Spike TV.

Background

The event was initially scheduled to feature a championship match for the Featherweight Title between Pat Curran and Daniel Mason-Straus.  However, on February 26, it was announced that Straus had broken his hand and had to pull out of the fight.  On February 27, it was announced that recent tournament winner Shahbulat Shamhalaev would advance with his title shot and he faced Curran on this card.

The card was to feature the #1-ranked 125-pound female fighter according to the Unified Women's MMA Rankings Jessica Eye vs. Munah Holland in a Women's Flyweight bout, but Eye had to withdraw due to a back injury.

Results

Tournaments

Light Heavyweight tournament bracket

Middleweight tournament bracket

Welterweight tournament bracket

Lightweight tournament bracket

Featherweight tournament bracket

Bellator 96

Bellator 96 took place on June 19, 2013 at the Winstar World Casino in Thackerville, Oklahoma.  The event was distributed live in prime time by Spike TV.  It marked the season debut of the 2013 summer series. Randy Couture, Frank Shamrock, Greg Jackson and Joe Warren took part in commentary.

Background

Bellator 96 featured the opening round of the 2013 Summer Series Heavyweight and Light Heavyweight tournaments.

This event served as the lead in for the debut of Bellator's new reality TV series, Fight Master: Bellator MMA.

Michael Chandler was expected to defend his Lightweight Title against Dave Jansen on this card.  However, on June 2, it was announced that Jansen had to pull out of the bout due to an injury.

Vinicius Queiroz was originally scheduled to face Richard Hale in the heavyweight tournament.  Queiroz, however, suffered a knee injury and was replaced Ryan Martinez.

Both Derek Campos and Keith Berry missed weight for their fights; as a result, both fighters forfeited a portion of their purses to their opponents and the matches were changed to catchweight.

Both Seth Petruzelli & Renato Sobral retired from MMA competition after this event.

Results

Bellator 97

Bellator 97 took place on July 31, 2013 at the Santa Ana Star Center in Rio Rancho, New Mexico.  The event was distributed live in prime time by Spike TV.

Background

The card featured Ben Askren's fourth title defense of the Bellator Welterweight Championship and Michael Chandler's second defense of the Bellator Lightweight Championship.

The card also featured the Heavyweight and Light Heavyweight Tournament Finals and Bantamweight Tournament Semifinals.

Douglas Lima and Ben Saunders were scheduled to fight in order to decide the next contender for the Welterweight title. However, on June 11, it was announced that Lima had to pull out of the bout due to an injury.

Patricio Freire was originally scheduled to face The Ultimate Fighter veteran Rob Emerson.  However, on July 12, it was revealed Emerson had to withdraw due to injury and was replaced by Jared Downing.

The live airing featured the announcement of Bellator's first pay per view event for November 2, 2013 that will be headlined by Tito Ortiz versus Quinton Jackson.

Results

Tournaments

Heavyweight tournament bracket

Light Heavyweight tournament bracket

Bantamweight tournament bracket

Bellator 98

Bellator 98 took place on September 7, 2013 at the Mohegan Sun Arena in Uncasville, Connecticut. The event aired live in prime time on Spike TV.  It marked the season debut of season nine.

Background

Bellator 98 was supposed to feature a Bellator Middleweight Championship bout between Alexander Shlemenko and Season 8 Middleweight Tournament Winner Doug Marshall. However, on August 19 Marshall was forced out of the title bout due to an injury and was replaced by Season 8 Middleweight Tournament Runner Up Brett Cooper.

The Fight Master: Bellator MMA finale between Joe Riggs and Mike Bronzoulis was expected to take place at this event.  However, on September 3, it was revealed Riggs has sustained a significant eye injury and the bout was postponed indefinitely. The fight was later scheduled for Bellator 106.

Dan Cramer was originally scheduled to face Perry Filkins in the Middleweight tournament opening round, but withdrew from the match and was replaced by Jeremy Kimball.

Joe Warren was scheduled to face Nick Kirk on this card.  However, on the Friday before the event, Warren was removed for undisclosed medical reasons. The fight was later scheduled for Bellator 101

Andreas Spang was originally scheduled to face Justin Torrey in the Middleweight tournament opening round, but was declared unfit to fight by the Mohegan Tribe Department of Athletic Regulation. He was replaced by Brennan Ward, who originally was supposed to face Dave Vitkay on the preliminary card.

Andrew Calandrelli was originally scheduled to face Ryan Quinn, but was removed from the card and replaced by Brylan Van Artsdalen.

The card featured all the Middleweight Tournament Quarterfinal bouts.

Results

Bellator 99

Bellator 99 took place on September 13, 2013 at the Pechanga Resort & Casino in Temecula, California. The event aired live in prime time on Spike TV.

Background

Bellator 99 featured the Featherweight Tournament Quarterfinal bouts.

Vladimir Matyushenko was originally scheduled to face for Bellator Light Heavyweight champion Christian M'Pumbu.  However, on August 18, it was announced that M'Pumbu had a hand injury and he was replaced by Houston Alexander.

Shahbulat Shamhalaev was originally scheduled to face Akop Stepanyan on this card.  However, on September 9, it was revealed Shamhalaev was forced to pull out of the tournament due to his ailing father.  He was replaced by Justin Wilcox.

A bantamweight bout between Derek Loffer and Mario Navarro was initially planned for this card, but cancelled for unknown reasons.

Results

Bellator 100

Bellator 100 took place on September 20, 2013 at the Grand Canyon University Arena in Phoenix, Arizona. The event aired live in prime time on Spike TV.

Background

Bellator 100 featured the Season 9 Welterweight Tournament Quarterfinal bouts and the Season 8 Welterweight finals.

Matt Riddle was originally scheduled to face Luis Melo on this card, but pulled out due to a cracked rib. He was replaced by Ron Keslar.

Mark Scanlon was originally scheduled to face Herman Terrado on this card, but pulled out due to an injury and was replaced by Rick Hawn

Results

Bellator 101

Bellator 101 took place on September 27, 2013 at the Rose Garden Arena in Portland, Oregon. The event aired live in prime time on Spike TV.

Background

Bellator 101 featured the Season 9 Lightweight Tournament Quarterfinal bouts.

Rob Sinclair was scheduled to face Rich Clementi in a Lightweight Tournament Quarterfinal fight, but on Sept. 9, 2013 had to pull out due to injury and was replaced by Ricardo Tirloni. Marcin Held was originally scheduled to face Tirloni on the preliminary card, and Ryan Healy took the fight as a replacement.

Results

Bellator 102

Bellator 102 took place on October 4, 2013 at Visalia Convention Center in Visalia, California. The event aired live in prime time on Spike TV.

Background

Bellator 102 featured the Heavyweight Tournament Semifinals, Middleweight Tournament Semifinals and Summer Series bantamweight tournament final between Anthony Leone and Rafael "Morcego" Silva.

Michael Page and Kenny Ento were scheduled to face each other in a Welterweight bout on this card.  However, on September 30, it was announced that Page was injured and both he and Ento were removed from the card.

Perry Filkins was to face Brennan Ward in the Middleweight Tournament Semifinals.  However, he had to pull out due to injury and was replaced by Joe Pacheco.

Results

Bellator 103

Bellator 103 took place on October 11, 2013 at Kansas Star Arena in Mulvane, Kansas. The event aired live in prime time on Spike TV.

Background

Bellator 103 featured the Featherweight Tournament Semifinal bouts.

Results

Bellator 104

Bellator 104 took place on October 18, 2013 at the U.S. Cellular Center in Cedar Rapids, Iowa. The event aired live in prime time on Spike TV.

Background

Bellator 104 featured the Welterweight Tournament Semifinal bouts.

Results

Bellator 105

Bellator 105 took place on October 25, 2013 at Santa Ana Star Center in Rio Rancho, New Mexico. The event aired live in prime time on Spike TV.

Background

Bellator 105 featured the Lightweight Tournament Semifinal bouts.

Eugene Fadiora was initially scheduled to face Andreas Spang.  However, Spang was removed from the card and replaced by Keith Berry.

Results

Bellator 106

Bellator 106 took place on November 2, 2013 at Convention and Entertainment Center in Long Beach, California. The event aired live on Spike TV.

Background

Bellator 106 was to be Bellator's first ever pay-per-view event and was expected to be headlined by a Light Heavyweight bout between Tito Ortiz and Quinton Jackson, both of whom would have been making their promotional debuts. However, on October 25, it was announced that Ortiz was out of the bout due to injury.  Subsequently, Bellator announced that the show would air on Spike TV rather that PPV.

The main event featured a Lightweight title rematch between the current champion Michael Chandler and former champion Eddie Alvarez.  Chandler defeated Alvarez via fourth round submission in their original bout back at Bellator 58.

The Heavyweight tournament final between Cheick Kongo and Vinicius Queiroz was originally scheduled for this card.  However, an injury to Queiroz forced it off the card and it will be rescheduled on a future show.

Results

|-
! colspan="8" style="background:#ccf; color:navy; text-align:center;"| Preliminary Card (Spike.com)

|-
! colspan="8" style="background:#ccf; color:navy; text-align:center;"| Unaired

Bellator 107

Bellator 107 took place on November 8, 2013 at the WinStar World Casino in Thackerville, Oklahoma. The event aired live in prime time on Spike TV.

Background

Bellator 107 featured the Heavyweight Tournament final, Middleweight Tournament final and Bantamweight Tournament final.

Cheick Kongo was originally scheduled to face Vinicius Queiroz in the Heavyweight tournament finals, but Queiroz withdrew due to a knee injury. He was replaced by Peter Graham.

Results

Bellator 108

Bellator 108 took place on November 15, 2013 at Revel Casino in Atlantic City, New Jersey The event aired live in prime time on Spike TV.

Background

Bellator 108 featured the Featherweight Tournament Finals.

Heavyweight champion Alexander Volkov made the first defense of his title against Vitaly Minakov on this show in the co-main event.

The card featured the Bellator debut of Quinton Jackson following the cancellation of his bout against Tito Ortiz.  He faced Bellator and UFC veteran Joey Beltran in the main event.

Nah-Shon Burrell was originally scheduled to face Dante Rivera on this card. However, he was rescheduled to face Jesus Martinez due to undisclosed reasons.

Results

Bellator 109

Bellator 109 took place on November 22, 2013 at Sands Casino Event Center in Bethlehem, Pennsylvania. The event aired live in prime time on Spike TV.

Background

Bellator 109 featured the 2013 Season 9 Welterweight and Lightweight Tournament Finals.

Michael Page and Andrew Osbourne were slated to face each other in a Welterweight bout on this card but the fight was scrapped due to Page recovering from lingering injuries.

Matt Riddle was expected to come out of his 3-week retirement to fight Nathan Coy at this event. However, he pulled out of the bout on November 13, 2013.

Results

Tournaments

Heavyweight tournament bracket

(*) Replaced Vinicius Queiroz

Middleweight tournament bracket

(*) Replaced Andreas Spang
(**) Replaced Dan Cramer
(***) Replaced Perry Filkins

Welterweight tournament bracket

(*) Replaced Matt Riddle
(**) Replaced Mark Scanlon

Lightweight tournament bracket

 (*) Replaced Rob Sinclair

Featherweight tournament bracket

(*) Replaced Shahbulat Shamhalaev

Bantamweight tournament bracket

References

External links
Bellator

2013 American television seasons
2013 in mixed martial arts
Bellator MMA events